The Sun Don't Lie is an album by Marcus Miller, released in 1993 on PRA Records. The album rose to No. 10 on the Billboard Jazz Albums chart. The album "is dedicated to the memory of Miles Davis."

Overview 
The Sun Don't Lie was Grammy nominated in the category of Best Contemporary Jazz Performance.

Track listing 
All tracks composed by Marcus Miller; except where noted.
 "Panther" – 	6:02
 "Steveland" – 	7:21
 "Rampage" – 	5:48
 "The Sun Don't Lie" – 	6:29
 "Scoop" – 	5:59
 "Mr. Pastorius" – 	1:25
 "Funny (All She Needs Is Love)" (Miller, Boz Scaggs) – 	5:26
 "Moons" – 	4:52
 "Teen Town" (Jaco Pastorius) – 	4:55
 "Juju"  (Miller, Wayne Shorter) – 	6:03
 "The King Is Gone (For Miles)" – 	6:05

Personnel

Marcus Miller  – bass guitar, bass clarinet, rhythm guitar, keyboards, vocals, programming, drum programming
Don Alias  – percussion, conga	
Poogie Bell  – drums	
Dean Brown – lead guitar	
Hiram Bullock  – guitar	
Jonathan Butler  – guitar	
Will Calhoun  – drums	
Paulinho Da Costa  – percussion	
Miles Davis  – trumpet	
Steve Ferrone  – high hat, sidestick, bass drum
Kenny Garrett  – alto saxophone
Omar Hakim  – snare drum, bass drum, cymbals
Everette Harp  – alto and soprano saxophone
Paul Jackson, Jr.  – rhythm guitar	
Sal Marquez  – additional trumpet
Andy Narell  – steel drums
Eric Persing  – programming	
Vernon Reid  – guitar	
Philippe Saisse  – keyboards, programming	
Joe Sample  – piano	
David Sanborn  – alto saxophone	
Wayne Shorter  – soprano and tenor saxophone
Michael "Patches" Stewart  – trumpet	
Steve Thornton  – percussion		
Kirk Whalum  – tenor saxophone
Lenny White  – percussion, drums
Maurice White  – vocal samples
Michael White  – drums
Christian "Wicked" Wicht  – additional keyboards
Tony Williams  – drums

Production

Marcus Miller – producer, engineer
Ray Bardani – engineer, mixing
Thom Cadley, Scott Canto, Todd Childress, Ryan Dorn, Jim Giddens, Aaron Kropf, Jimmie Lee, Roger Lian, Chrystin Nevarez, Brian Pollack, Chris Rich, Rob Rives, Frank Vially, Todd Whitelock – assistant engineer
Peter Doell, Leslie Ann Jones, Bruce Miller, Yan Memmi – engineer
Bibi Green – production coordination
John Heiden – art direction, design
Goh Hotoda, Bill Schnee – mixing
Bob Ludwig – mastering
Jason Miles – programming
Lorinda Sullivan - front cover photography

References

Marcus Miller albums
1993 albums
Miles Davis tribute albums
Albums produced by Marcus Miller